Malinda Kathleen Reese (born June 27, 1994) is an American Internet personality, singer-songwriter and stage actress. She is best known for her Irish music covers on Tiktok (2 Million+ Followers), as well as Twisted Translations on YouTube, in which she  previously   created songs and performances from song lyrics and other texts that have been translated through multiple languages and back into English using Google Translate; in that guise, she has over one million subscribers. Currently, she releases original music and vlogs on her main channel, MALINDA. Her debut is a 2018 EP, Love Letter. In addition, she has performed in numerous theatre plays in the Washington, D.C., area, including playing Girl in the musical Once, for which she won a Helen Hayes Award in 2020.

Early life and education
Reese was born and raised in Washington, D.C. She is the only child of Mary Hall Surface, a teacher and playwright, and Kevin Reese, an actor. She recalls spending much of her youth backstage during theater performances, and spending time in costume shops. As a teenager, she went to Interlochen Arts Camp in Michigan and Broadway Artists Alliance in New York City.

She learned to play the Irish flute at the age of thirteen, having been "drawn" to the instrument from a young age. She is also able to play guitar, ukulele, electric piano, cajón and classical flute.

Reese attended Sidwell Friends School in Washington, D.C., and later Vassar College, New York where she initially studied cognitive science, before switching to Drama, in which she majored, and Religion, in which she minored. She also studied drama in London in 2014.

Career

YouTube

Twisted Translations
Twisted Translations (formerly Google Translate Sings and Translator Fails) is Reese's initial YouTube channel, in which she translates song lyrics and other texts through Google Translate, through other languages and back into English, to create a parody of the song or text.

She came up with the idea of Twisted Translations while she was a student at Vassar College. After watching a video of "Let It Go" sung in various languages, she noticed that the Spanish translation wasn't exact. Her college friends began using Google Translate to create humorous alternatives to famous works of literature, inspiring Reese to do the same with song lyrics. Her first translation video was uploaded on February 10, 2014, and quickly went viral, amassing one million views within a week. On February 14, she announced on YouTube that she would create more translation videos. Other Twisted Translations songs include songs from Mulan, "One Day I'll Fly Away" from Moulin Rouge! and "Hello" by Adele. In her Twisted Translations song videos, she often dresses as the character or singer of the song. In 2022, via Instagram Stories, Malinda revealed she was done doing Google Translate Sings as she “doesn’t find the time” to do them anymore, due to her focus on her more successful tiktok.

MALINDA channel 
In 2018, she launched another YouTube channel, MALINDA, which contains vlogs, song covers, and comedic songs, as well as her original songs. In March 2019, the channel surpassed 100,000 subscribers.

Music

In 2018, Reese launched her singing career. Her debut EP, Love Letter, was released on September 14, 2018.

On May 15, 2020, she released the single "More With You", which involved a collaboration of more than 50 musicians from 17 countries.

In 2021, she produced a cover of Wellerman as part of  the ‘ShantyTok’ trend on TikTok.  She had previously created a shanty-style song about puffins on her YouTube channel, featuring user-submitted lyrics.

On July 16, 2021, she released her second EP, The Folks I Love, a collection of Folk-style cover versions.

In early 2022, she embarked on a Folks I Love Tour.

In a video in October 2022, she announced her debut album would be released in spring of 2023.

Singing in empty churches

In 2018, during a trip to Montefrío, Spain, she sang "O Come, O Come Emmanuel" impromptu in Iglesia de la Incarnación when it was empty, so the sound resonated.
Footage of the singing was uploaded to YouTube and went viral, to Reese's surprise. It was shared by Spanish news outlets and artists, including Alejandro Sanz.

In 2019, she sang "How Can I Keep from Singing?" in Washington National Cathedral while empty.

Acting
Reese frequently performed as a child actor at the Kennedy Center in Washington, D.C.

In 2017, Reese played the titular character in Ella Enchanted, a stage musical adapted from the book of the same name. The play was directed by her mother, Mary Hall Surface. DC Theatre Scene praised Reese's performance, calling it "truly enchanting".

In 2019, she starred as "Girl" in the stage production Once at the Olney Theatre Center. She received positive reviews. DC Metro Theatre Arts called her and Gregory Maheu, who portrayed "Guy", "standouts" and commented they "bring depth to both their solos and duets" while Washington Post said she was "effectively direct". Her performance won her a Helen Hayes Award for Best Actress in a Musical and a BroadwayWorld Washington, DC Awards for Best Actress in a Musical - Large Professional Theatre.

Personal life 
In October 2022, Reese came out as bisexual in a video entitled "I have some things to tell you". She said she was inspired to come out publicly, after having previously been a "quiet queer", through her involvement with Irish music, which she saw as "music of the oppressed".

Theatre

Discography

EPs 
 Love Letter (2018)
 The Folks I Love (2021)
 Sea to Sky (2021)

Album 
 It's All True (2023)

References

External links 
 
 
 Translator Fails on YouTube
 

21st-century American actresses
21st-century American women singers
21st-century American singers
Actresses from Washington, D.C.
American multi-instrumentalists
American musical theatre actresses
American people of Irish descent
American stage actresses
American YouTubers
Comedy YouTubers
Music-related YouTube channels
Music YouTubers
Singers from Washington, D.C.
YouTube channels launched in 2014
YouTube channels launched in 2018
YouTube vloggers

1994 births
Living people
Bisexual entertainers
Bisexual women
LGBT YouTubers